Bent (also Romanized as Bint) is a city in Bent District, Nik Shahr County, Sistan and Baluchestan province, Iran. At the 2006 census, its population was 4,302, in 822 families. At the 2016 census, its population had risen to 5,822.

References

Populated places in Nik Shahr County

Cities in Sistan and Baluchestan Province